The following is a list of Gambian politicians, both past and present. 


B 
Bah, Hamat
Bajo, Lamin Kaba
Bala Gaye, Musa Gibril 
Bojang, Lamin

C 
Camara, Assan Musa
Ceesay, Fatoumata Jahumpa
Colley, Angela

D 
Dabo, Bakary Bunja
Darboe, Numukunda
Darboe, Ousainou 
Dibba, Sheriff Mustapha

F 
Faye, John C.

G 
Garba Jahumpa, Bala
Garba Jahumpa, Ibrahim

J 
Jabang, Lamine Kitty
Jagne, Baboucarr-Blaise
Jallow, Omar
Jammeh, Yahya 
Jatta, Sidia
Jawara, Dawda
Jobe, Momodou Lamin Sedat
Joiner, Julia Dolly
Joof, Alhaji A.E. Cham

N 
N'Jie, Pierre Sarr
Njie, Aliu Badara
Njie, Omar
Njie Saidy, Isatou (Aisatu N'Jie-Saidy)

P 
Phatey, MJM Babung

S 
Sallah, Halifa
Sanneh, Sidi Moro
Sey, Omar
Singateh, Farimang Mamadi
Singateh, Edward
Sonko, Bolong

T 
Touray, Yankuba
Isatou Touray, the first woman to run for the Presidency of the Gambia

 
Lists of people by occupation and nationality